The Australian (Sydney, NSW, 1824–1848) was an English language newspaper published in Sydney, Australia.

It first appeared in 1824 and was the second newspaper to be printed on mainland Australia after The Sydney Gazette (1803). The latter was a semi-official publication containing proclamations, regulations and it was censored by the government.

The Australian was the first independent newspaper. Governor Brisbane realised there was little point in continuing to censor The Sydney Gazette when The Australian was uncensored and so government censorship of newspapers was abandoned in 1824 and the freedom of the press began in Australia.

History

The early years

The first issue of The Australian appeared on Thursday, 14 October 1824. The owners of the newspaper were two lawyers, Robert Wardell and William Charles Wentworth. They had a printing press and other necessary materials with them on the Alfred which arrived at Sydney from Britain in July 1824.

Wardell had previously owned and edited a London evening newspaper, the Statesman. He edited and wrote most of the articles in The Australian and dealt with the day to day running of the paper. Wentworth wrote the occasional editorial and provided £4000 for working capital and running costs. The newspaper championed the Emancipist cause in New South Wales. It pushed for an elected assembly, a low property franchise, trial by jury and for emancipists to be given the right to vote and to sit on juries. It opposed autocracy and sought, "to convert a prison into a colony fit for a freeman." It often expressed liberal views and sometimes opposed the governor.

The only early rival to The Australian was The Sydney Gazette and New South Wales Advertiser, first published on 5 March 1803. It was subject from the start to the censorship of the secretary to the Governor, and later, the Colonial Secretary. In the face of a competitor free of censorship the editor of the gazette approached the governor to request that his publication too should be free of censorship. Governor Brisbane agreed and explained his reasoning in a despatch to Earl Bathurst dated 12 July 1825.

The Australian took an interest in the economy and provided support for any enterprise that promised to create economic growth and employment. One industry it championed was the whaling trade in New South Wales.

The first printer of The Australian was George Williams (c1784-1838). 
The paper initially appeared weekly, and then, from April 1826, bi-weekly. It appeared three times a week from October 1838. It usually consisted of four broadsheet pages. The occasional supplement, to report an important event, increased its length to six pages. The newspaper was sold for one shilling per copy. In his survey of Australian literature H. M. Green notes layout innovations introduced by the paper.

The later years
Wardell was followed as editor and publisher by Atwell Edwin Hayes in 1828 and he remained in charge till 1833. He was followed by George Nichols as editor and co-owner till June 1841. The assistant editor under Nichols was journalist James Martin. Abraham Cohen (1812–1874) was the printer of the newspaper by April 1836 and he became co-owner, in partnership with Nichols, in May 1837. Cohen was the editor, printer and sole owner by September 1838 and he remained in charge till September 1839. Printer George Moss (1809–1854) and the Rev. Wickham M. Hesketh (1807–1868) were the co-owners by June 1841 and they continued as joint owners till their partnership was dissolved in June 1843. Thomas Forster was the printer and publisher for the owners by December 1843. Forster and Edwyn Henry Statham (1811–1887) were joint owners by January 1844. Wealthy pastoralist James Macarthur was a financial backer of the newspaper by mid 1843 and as a mortgagee was owed £2,600. Soon after he assumed ownership. Edward Smith Hall (1786–1860) was made editor in April 1846 and he remained till June 1847.

There were hazards to editing a colonial newspaper. Wardell was challenged to a duel by the governor's private secretary over an article that had appeared in The Australian in 1827. In the same year he was sued for libel. The same thing happened to the next editor, Atwell Hayes, who in 1829 was found guilty of criminal libel, fined £100 and sentenced to six months in prison.

The market value of the newspaper as a going concern fluctuated over the years. It was valued at £3,600 when purchased by a consortium of Sydney auctioneers in 1828. But its value had declined to £2,000 by 1843, probably due to the economic depression of the early 1840s.

Its circulation also varied over time. It was reported to average 600 copies per issue in 1827, but this had fallen to 400 by 1836. By March 1838 circulation had risen to 800 copies per issue.

Sometimes publication had to be suspended due to a shortage of newsprint. Another problem was a shortage of skilled labour. Assigned convicts were used in the print works but they could be unreliable employees. In 1838, the owners placed an advertisement cautioning publicans against supplying liquor to, "any Assigned Servant of this Establishment," and advised that, "Any credit given [would be] at their own risk."

Income from advertisements was fairly steady and easy to collect, but it made up less than half the newspapers income. The bulk came the sale of copies, especially via subscriptions taken out by individuals. This cost 8 shillings per quarter for Sydney residents and ten shillings and sixpence for country subscribers in 1838. Like other Sydney newspapers, The Australian made regular appeals to subscribers to pay their accounts and threatened to take legal action against customers who were in arrears. One reason for non-payment was because delivery could be irregular. The runners who made deliveries sometimes sold papers to people on the street and kept the money for themselves. Extra agents were appointed to collect subscriptions, reduce bad debts and increase circulation. There were three agents outside Sydney in 1836, at Parramatta, Campbell Town and Maitland.<ref>The Australian, 26 June 1836, p. 1.</ref> This number had increased to thirteen by June 1838, and included one agent in the Port Phillip District (Victoria). The additional agents helped to double the circulation of the newspaper. But subscribers were still slow to pay, particularly in rural areas, and the newspaper was owed almost £3,000 in unpaid subscriptions by August 1838.

The last issue of the paper appeared on Thursday 28 September 1848. Publication ceased due to, "the large amount of unpaid subscriptions, which we are unable to collect without proceeding to compulsory measures".

Achievements and legacyThe Australian was the first independent newspaper in the colonies and as such it was pivotal in helping to establish the freedom of the press in Australia. It created a new forum for the free discussion of constitutional and political issues that had been lacking before. In particular it gave a voice to the disenfranchised, emancipists, convicts and others on fringes in colonial society. It supported economic growth and encouraged new enterprises likely to create jobs and income.

It created a forum where the government could be called to account and is credited with helping to curb some of the worst excesses of the penal system. One contemporary who commented on flogging and other harsh punishments administered to convicts under sentence in New South Wales went on to say,

The newspaper provided a showcase for early Australian literature. Local writers who were first published in its pages include Henry Halloran, Charles Harpur and Richard Howitt. Many readers also first became aware of the books of British authors, such as Charles Dickens, when they were discussed in the pages of The Australian.

The newspaper continues to serve the public by providing a detailed source of information on social, political, economic and cultural activities in Australia in the second quarter of the 19th century.

Digitisation
The entire run of the newspaper has been digitised as part of the Australian Newspapers Digitisation Program, a project of the National Library of Australia in cooperation with the State Library of New South Wales.

See also
 List of newspapers in Australia
 List of newspapers in New South Wales

References
 Atkinson, Alan & Marian Averling (eds.) (1987), Australians 1838, Sydney, Fairfax, Syme & Weldon Associates.  
 Green, Henry and Dorothy (1984), A history of Australian literature, Volume I, 1789–1923, Sydney, Angus & Robertson, pp. 81–3. 
 Keneally, Thomas (2009), Australians: Origins to Eureka, Volume 1, Allen & Unwin, Sydney, 
 Walker, Thomas (1976), The newspaper press in New South Wales, 1803–1920, Sydney University Press, 
 Wilde, William, Joy Hooton and Barry Andrews (1986), The Oxford companion to Australian literature'', Oxford University Press, Melbourne.

Notes

External links
 

1824 establishments in Australia
Defunct newspapers published in Sydney
Publications established in 1824
Publications disestablished in 1848
Freedom of the press by country
Newspapers on Trove
Defunct newspapers published in New South Wales